Highway 726 is a highway in the Canadian province of Saskatchewan. It runs from Highway 651 / Highway 16 near Theodore to Highway 8.

Highway 726 passes near the communities of Springside, Ebenezer, and Rhein. Highway 726 connects with Highways 47, 9, 309, and 637.

See also 
Roads in Saskatchewan
Transportation in Saskatchewan

References 

726